Felipe Antonio Lira (born April 26, 1972) is a Venezuelan former Major League Baseball pitcher who played for the Detroit Tigers (-), Seattle Mariners (1997-) and Montreal Expos (-). He batted and threw right-handed.

Career 
In a six-year career, Lira compiled a 26–46 record with 348 strikeouts and a 5.32 ERA in 577 innings. As a batter with the Expos, he hit .211 (4-for-19) with two home runs. On  August 29, 1995, Lira notched his one and only MLB save. He recorded the final out of the game to preserve a 7-5 Tigers victory over the White Sox. He saved the game for starter Sean Bergman. On September 6, 1996, Lira gave up Eddie Murray's 500th HR.

See also
 List of players from Venezuela in Major League Baseball

References

External links

1976 births
Living people
Bristol Tigers players
Detroit Tigers players
Everett AquaSox players
Fayetteville Generals players
Guerreros de Oaxaca players
Lakeland Tigers players
London Tigers players
Louisville Bats players
Montreal Expos players
Major League Baseball pitchers
Major League Baseball players from Venezuela
Mexican League baseball pitchers
Norfolk Tides players
Ottawa Lynx players
People from Miranda (state)
Rieleros de Aguascalientes players
Scranton/Wilkes-Barre Red Barons players
Seattle Mariners players
Tacoma Rainiers players
Tiburones de La Guaira players
Toledo Mud Hens players
Venezuelan expatriate baseball players in Canada
Venezuelan expatriate baseball players in Mexico
Venezuelan expatriate baseball players in the United States
Yuma Scorpions players